Miroslav Hrdina (born 23 September 1976) is a Slovak football goalkeeper who currently plays for Sereď .

Honours
 Winner of Slovak Cup 1997/1998 with Spartak Trnava.

External links

References

1976 births
Living people
Slovak footballers
Slovak expatriate footballers
Slovak expatriate sportspeople in Malaysia
Association football goalkeepers
FC Nitra players
FC Baník Prievidza players
FC Spartak Trnava players
MFK Zemplín Michalovce players
Selangor FA players
Slovak Super Liga players
Expatriate footballers in the Czech Republic
Expatriate footballers in Malaysia
Sportspeople from Nitra